Zarna may refer to :

Places and jurisdictions 
Africa 
 Zarna (Africa), an Ancient city of Roman Africa, former diocese and Latin Catholic titular bishopric

Asia 
 Zərnə, Azerbaijan
 Zarna, alternate name of Zarnan, Lorestan, Iran
 Zarna, alternate name of Zarnaq, Iran
 Zarna, alternate name of Zarneh, Isfahan, Iran

Europe
 Żarna, Poland

Persons 
 Zarna, Indian/Hindi name for girls, meaning plural of spring and/or origin of river where water flows to the surface of the earth from multiple locations in the mountains